Sowcarpet is a neighborhood in the northern part of Chennai, India. Sowcarpet is one of the oldest neighborhoods of the city with narrow streets and vintage buildings. It is a bustling commercial area of the city, and a range of wholesale markets are located here. The locality is known as the North Indian hub of Chennai owing to the presence of the North Indian community here. Sowcarpet is home to the largest Marwadi community in South India.

Etymology
The neighbourhood derives its name from the term "sowcar" which comes from the Hindi word sahukaar, originally meaning merchant or native banker. The term now refers to a money-lender.

History
Sowcarpet is often referred to as "Little North India" owing to the presence of a predominantly North Indian population. The neighbourhood is home to the city's first North-Indian Jain temples. It is also flanked with shops and eateries offering north Indian foods and delicacies.

In his book Madras Rediscovered, Chennai city chronicler S. Muthiah writes that Gujarati immigrants from Saurashtra who established themselves as a weaving community in Madurai and Tirunelveli arrived in the Sowcarpet neighbourhood in the 17th century. The diamond and silk merchants, who gave the neighbourhood its name, arrived in the 18th century from Gujarat. Other settlers in the neighbourhood includes the Marwaris from Rajasthan, who arrived later.

Description
Sowcarpet is considered a shopper's paradise owing to the presence of shops and outlets selling a wide range of finished goods. Most streets in Sowcarpet are rather narrow, with a few exceptions like Mint Street and nearby area. The buildings in the streets are so close to each other that they look like they share a common wall. The sight is typical of the crowded bazaars of Indian cities – a potpourri of different vendors and artisans, trading and making a variety of articles. The wholesale markets for several goods are in Narayana Mudali street, Govindappa Naicken street and Rattan Bazaar. The area around Kasi Chetty street and Mint street is famous for shopping and for small eateries serving traditional North Indian, chiefly Gujarati and Marwari, chaat and other delicacies. Patni Plaza and Naidu Plaza are some of the well known shopping malls in the area. Kakada Ramprasad and Novelty Tea House, both started in 1958, are some of the notable eateries in the neighbourhood.

The neighbourhood is known for its Holi and Raksha Bandhan celebrations.

Economy
It has been estimated that the turnover of the neighbourhood is anywhere between 100,000 million and 150,000 million a year.

See also
 George Town
 Parry’s Corner
 History of Chennai

References

Neighbourhoods in Chennai